K is the debut album by English psychedelic rock band Kula Shaker, released on 16 September 1996. A concept album, themed on Indian mysticism, it became the fastest selling debut album in Britain since Elastica's debut the previous year, selling over 130,000 copies in the first week. The album reached the number-one position on the UK Albums Chart and number 200 on the US Billboard 200. It was voted number 879 in the third edition of Colin Larkin's All Time Top 1000 Albums (2000).

The Grateful Dead's psychedelic rock style is an influence on Kula Shaker's first and second albums. The hidden track after "Hollow Man" is a recording of A. C. Bhaktivedanta Swami Prabhupada, the founder of the International Society for Krishna Consciousness, speaking about his own guru.

Artwork
The cover art (by comic-book artist Dave Gibbons) consists of various images related to the letter K, including:
John F. Kennedy, Lord Kitchener, Karl Marx, Gene Kelly, Katharine Hepburn, Ken Dodd, Kareem Abdul-Jabbar, Danny Kaye, Kal-El (Superman), Boris Karloff (as Frankenstein's monster), Krishna, King Kong, Martin Luther King Jr., two Knights (a pair of Keys on one of them), a Kettle, Kali, the Kaiser, Nikita Khrushchev, Grace Kelly, the number 11 (symbolizing K), and Rudyard Kipling's book Kim.

Track listing

Personnel
Kula Shaker
Crispian Mills – singing, electric and acoustic guitars, tamboura
Alonza Bevan – bass, piano, tabla, backing vocals
Paul Winterhart – drums
Jay Darlington – organ, Mellotron, piano

Guest musicians
Wajahat Kahn – sarod (on "Sleeping Jiva")
Himangsu Goswami – tabla (on "Govinda" and "Jerry Was There")
Gouri Choudhury – backing vocals (on "Govinda", credited as "Gouri")
The Kick Horns – horns (on "Start All Over")

Charts

Weekly charts

Year-end charts

Certifications

References

External links

K at YouTube (streamed copy where licensed)

Kula Shaker albums
1996 debut albums
Albums produced by John Leckie
Columbia Records albums
Cultural depictions of John F. Kennedy
Cultural depictions of Martin Luther King Jr.
Cultural depictions of Nikita Khrushchev
Cultural depictions of Wilhelm II
Cultural depictions of Herbert Kitchener, 1st Earl Kitchener